Cadoxton may refer to:

Cadoxton, Vale of Glamorgan, a district of the town of Barry in South Wales
Cadoxton (electoral ward), Wales, covering the Cadoxton-juxta-Neath area
Cadoxton-juxta-Neath, a village in Neath Port Talbot, Wales